is a railway station in the city of Sanjō, Niigata, Japan, operated by East Japan Railway Company (JR East). The station sits directly on the border of the cities of Sanjō and Tsubame. As the station headquarters are located on the Sanjō side of the station, Tsubame-Sanjō Station is considered to be in Sanjō.

Lines
Tsubame-Sanjō Station is served by the high-speed Jōetsu Shinkansen line between Tokyo and Niigata, and also by the Yahiko Line.

Station layout
The station has one elevated island platform and one side platform for the Jōetsu Shinkansen, and one ground-level side platform for the Yahiko Line, which is at a right angle to the Shinkansen platforms. The station building is located above the Yahiko Line platform and underneath the Shinkansen platforms.

The station has a Midori no Madoguchi staffed ticket office. Suica farecards can be used at this station.

Platforms

History
The station opened on 15 November 1982.

Passenger statistics
In fiscal 2017, the station was used by an average of 2285 passengers daily (boarding passengers only).

Surrounding area
Tsubame-Sanjō Station offers access to the Yahiko Shrine via the Yahiko Line. The shrine, located in the town of Yahiko, was the ichinomiya, or highest shrine, of the ancient Echigo Province, and has numerous Important Cultural Properties of Japan.

See also
 List of railway stations in Japan

References

External links

 Tsubame-Sanjō Station 

Railway stations in Niigata Prefecture
Railway stations in Japan opened in 1982
Stations of East Japan Railway Company
Yahiko Line
Jōetsu Shinkansen
Sanjō, Niigata